Adrien Giraud (4 October 1936 – 24 May 2018) was a French politician who was a member of the Senate of France, representing the island of Mayotte.  He was a member of the Centrist Union.

References

Page on the Senate website

1936 births
2018 deaths
Mayotte politicians
French Senators of the Fifth Republic
People from Mayotte
Senators of Mayotte